The , also known as the , is an identity document for citizens of Japan based on the . It is a smart card. Residents who wish to obtain the card can request an application form from the municipality where they reside and are required to submit the application form to the My Number Card center by mail.

The My Number Card is associated with the unique 12-digit My Number, which is issued to all residents, including foreigners residing in Japan.

Beginning in March 2021, the Japanese government began to issue My Number Cards embedded with IC chips that can double as health insurance cards. The government explained that the new feature would simplify administrative procedures at hospitals and applications for tax deductions for medical expenses. The new card can be read by card readers, and in conjunction with facial recognition, give facial medical care providers instant access to patients' past health checkup results and prescription drug history. However, as of October 2021 only 8% of medical providers and pharmacies accept the My Number Card.

Tate of uptake for the cards in Japan is around 25% in March 2021 and 40% as of October 2021. The government aims to have almost all residents obtain the card by March 2023.

See also

References

External links 
 

Government of Japan
National identification numbers
Smart cards